Dominik Livaković (born 9 January 1995) is a Croatian professional footballer who plays as a goalkeeper for Prva HNL club Dinamo Zagreb and the Croatia national team.

Club career
Livaković became part of NK Zagreb's first team at the beginning of the 2012–13 season. Initially the club's second-choice goalkeeper, he made his league debut on 31 August 2012, playing the full match in a 1–0 defeat at home to HNK Cibalia. He soon became the club's number one and made a total of 104 league appearances over four seasons, including 90 in the Prva HNL.

On 30 August 2015, he agreed to join Dinamo Zagreb at the beginning of the 2016–17 season. He made his league debut for the club on 2 October 2016 in a goalless draw at home to Hajduk Split. On 18 October 2016, he made his first appearance in the UEFA Champions League in a 1–0 defeat at home to Sevilla.

On 30 July 2019, in a Champions League qualifying 3–0 victory over Saburtalo Tbilisi, Livaković broke Dražen Ladić's record for most minutes from the start of Dinamo's season without conceding a goal (413), set in 1995. He conceded his first goal of the season three days later, in a 3–1 league victory over Gorica, set the new record at 535.

On 26 August 2020, in a Champions League qualifier against CFR Cluj, Livaković saved Ciprian Deac's penalty kick. The game went to extra time and ended as a 2–2 draw, resulting in a penalty shoot-out. Livaković saved Cătălin Golofca's attempt which would turn out crucial as Dinamo won the shootout 6–5 and progressed to the third qualifying round. In the 2020–21 Europa League group stage, Livaković was praised for his performances after he conceded only one goal in five games and led Dinamo to the first place in their group. He notably saved Steven Berghuis's penalty kick in Dinamo's 0–0 draw with Feyenoord on 22 October. On 18 March 2021, in the Europa League Round of 16 against Tottenham Hotspur, Livaković saved Harry Kane's sitter when the score was 3–0 for Dinamo, leading the club to a 3–2 aggregate victory and the first Europa League quarter-final in its history.

International career
Livaković received his first call-up to the Croatia national football team for their friendly against Moldova in May 2016. He made his debut against Chile in the 2017 China Cup where Croatia lost on penalties.

In May 2018 Livaković was named to Croatia's preliminary 32-man squad for the 2018 FIFA World Cup in Russia, and was eventually part of the team that finished runners-up after losing the final against France. He made his competitive debut against England in the 2018–19 Nations League match held on 12 October 2018 at Stadion Rujevica in Rijeka, which ended in a scoreless draw.

After disappointing performances by Lovre Kalinić, Livaković became Croatia's first-choice goalkeeper for the UEFA Euro 2020 qualifying campaign, starting with matchday 3 against Wales, held on 8 June 2019.

On 5 December 2022, in the 2022 FIFA World Cup round of 16 match against Japan, Livaković was named man of the match after saving three penalties in the shoot-out to help his side advance to the quarter-finals. He became the third goalkeeper to make three saves in a World Cup shoot-out, after Ricardo in 2006 and his fellow countryman Danijel Subašić in 2018. In the aforementioned quarter-finals, he saved another penalty in the shoot-out against Brazil, helping Croatia advance to the semi-finals. The performance earned him another man of the match award, as well as the rare 10/10 rating from L'Équipe, making him the 15th player in the magazine's history to be awarded it. Despite being one of the favourites for the FIFA World Cup Golden Glove award, he lost it to Emiliano Martínez.

Personal life 
Livaković hails from a prominent family. His father Zdravko Livaković is a construction engineer and a former State Secretary in the Ministry of the Sea, Transport and Infrastructure during the mandate of Božidar Kalmeta. His paternal grandfather and grandmother were a radiologist and an English teacher, respectively. His mother Manuela Skoblar is Josip Skoblar's first cousin once removed.

In June 2022, Livaković married his long-time girlfriend Helena Matić in the Zadar Cathedral.

He credited Danijel Subašić, David de Gea and Iker Casillas as his football role models.

Career statistics

Club

International

Honours
NK Zagreb
Druga HNL: 2013–14

Dinamo Zagreb
Prva HNL: 2017–18, 2018–19, 2019–20, 2020–21, 2021–22
Croatian Cup: 2017–18, 2020–21
Croatian Super Cup: 2019, 2022

Croatia
FIFA World Cup runner-up: 2018; third place: 2022

Individual
Trophy Footballer – Prva HNL Team of the Year: 2015, 2017, 2018, 2019, 2020, 2021, 2022
Trophy Footballer – Best Croatian goalkeeper: 2019, 2020, 2021, 2022
UEFA Europa League Breakthrough XI: 2018
UEFA Europa League Squad of the Season: 2020–21 
24 sata (Croatia) Prva HNL team of the Season: 2020-21
CIES Prva HNL Team of the Season: 2021/2022

Orders
Order of Duke Branimir: 2018

References

External links
 
Dominik Livaković at Sportnet.hr 

1995 births
Living people
Sportspeople from Zadar
Association football goalkeepers
Croatian footballers
NK Zagreb players
GNK Dinamo Zagreb players
GNK Dinamo Zagreb II players
Croatian Football League players
First Football League (Croatia) players
Croatia youth international footballers
Croatia under-21 international footballers
Croatia international footballers
2018 FIFA World Cup players
UEFA Euro 2020 players
2022 FIFA World Cup players